Beheloke is a town and commune in Madagascar. It belongs to the district of Toliara II, which is a part of Atsimo-Andrefana Region. The population of the commune was estimated to be approximately 10,000 in the 2001 commune census.

Primary and junior level secondary education are available in town. Farming and raising livestock provide employment for 5% and 70% of the working population. The most important crop is cassava, while other important products are maize, sweet potatoes and cowpeas. Services provide employment for 5% of the population. Additionally, fishing employs 20% of the population.

References and notes 

Populated places in Atsimo-Andrefana